Vivekananda Mahavidyalaya, established in 1966, is one of the oldest colleges in Haripal, in the Hooghly district, West Bengal, India. It offers undergraduate courses in arts, commerce and sciences. It is affiliated to  University of Burdwan.

History
For the socio-cultural and educational upliftment of the localities, Pandit Dharanath Bhattacharya, an eminent freedom fighter established a society named Vivekananda Samsad in 1963. Following the association the college was founded on 8 August 1966.

Departments

BCA

Science

Mathematics
Physics
Computer Science
Nutrition
Chemistry
Botany

Arts and Commerce

Bengali
English
Sanskrit
Santali
History
Geography
Political Science
Philosophy
Education
Commerce

Accreditation
The college is recognized by the University Grants Commission (UGC). It was accredited by the National Assessment and Accreditation Council (NAAC), and awarded B grade, an accreditation that has since then expired.

See also

References

External links
vmharipal.ac.in, Official Website

Universities and colleges in Hooghly district
Colleges affiliated to University of Burdwan
Educational institutions established in 1966
1966 establishments in West Bengal